The  is a museum located in Aomori, Aomori Prefecture, Japan.

The museum has a collection of artifacts from the Jōmon Period, as well as exhibits detailing Aomori's culture and history. The museum opened in 1973.

See also
List of Important Tangible Folk Cultural Properties

References

External links
 Official website 

Museums in Aomori Prefecture